The Iron Lady is a 2011 biographical drama film based on the life and career of Margaret Thatcher, a British politician who was the longest-serving Prime Minister of the United Kingdom of the 20th century and the first woman to hold the office. The film was directed by Phyllida Lloyd and written by Abi Morgan. Thatcher is portrayed primarily by Meryl Streep, and, in her formative and early political years, by Alexandra Roach. Thatcher's husband, Denis Thatcher, is portrayed by Jim Broadbent, and by Harry Lloyd as the younger Denis. Thatcher's longest-serving cabinet member and eventual deputy, Geoffrey Howe, is portrayed by Anthony Head.

Despite the film's mixed reception, Streep's performance was widely acclaimed. She received her 17th Oscar nomination for her portrayal and ultimately won the award for the third time, 29 years after her second Oscar win. She also earned her third Golden Globe Award for Best Actress – Motion Picture Drama award (her eighth Golden Globe Award win overall), and her second BAFTA Award for Best Actress in a Leading Role. The film also won the Academy Award for Best Makeup and the BAFTA Award for Best Makeup and Hair.

The film was loosely based on John Campbell's biography The Iron Lady: Margaret Thatcher, from Grocer's Daughter to Prime Minister.

Plot
The story begins with Thatcher in the present, then in a series of flashbacks, the audience is presented with a young Margaret Roberts working at the family grocer's shop in Grantham, listening to the political speeches of her father, whom she idolised it is also hinted that she had a poor relationship with her mother, a housewife.  We learn she has won a place at Oxford University, revealing her struggle, as a young lower-middle-class woman, attempting to break into a snobbish male-dominated Conservative Party and find a seat in the House of Commons, along with businessman Denis Thatcher's marriage proposal to her. Her struggles to fit in as a "Lady Member" of the House, and as Education Secretary in Edward Heath's Cabinet are also shown, as are her friendship with Airey Neave, her decision to stand for Leader of the Conservative Party, her eventual victory, including her voice coaching and image change.

Further flashbacks examine historical events during her time as Prime Minister, after winning the 1979 general election, including the rising unemployment related to her monetarist policies and the tight 1981 budget (over the misgivings of "wet" members of her Cabinet – Ian Gilmour, Francis Pym, Michael Heseltine, and Jim Prior), the 1981 Brixton riot, the 1984–1985 UK miners' strike, and the bombing in Brighton of the Grand Hotel during the 1984 Conservative Party Conference, when she and her husband were almost killed. Also shown is her decision to retake the Falkland Islands following the islands' invasion by Argentina in 1982, the sinking of the ARA General Belgrano and Britain's subsequent victory in the Falklands War, her friendship with U.S. President Ronald Reagan and emergence as a world figure, and the economic boom of the late 1980s.

By 1990, Thatcher is shown as an imperious but aging figure, ranting aggressively at her cabinet, refusing to accept that the "Poll Tax" is unjust, even while it is causing riots, and fiercely opposed to European integration. Her deputy, Geoffrey Howe, resigns after being humiliated by her in a cabinet meeting, Heseltine challenges her for the party leadership, and her loss of support from her cabinet colleagues leaves her little choice but reluctantly to resign as Prime Minister after eleven years in office. A teary-eyed Thatcher exits 10 Downing Street for the last time as Prime Minister with Denis comforting her. She is shown as still disheartened about it almost twenty years later.

Eventually, Thatcher is shown packing up her late husband's belongings, and telling him it's time for him to go. Denis' ghost leaves her as she cries that she actually is not yet ready to lose him, to which he replies "You're going to be fine on your own... you always have been" before leaving forever. Having finally overcome her grief, she contentedly washes a teacup alone in her kitchen.

Cast

 Meryl Streep as Margaret Thatcher
 Alexandra Roach as young Margaret Thatcher
 Jim Broadbent as Denis Thatcher
 Harry Lloyd as young Denis Thatcher
 Iain Glen as Alfred Roberts, Margaret's father
 Emma Dewhurst as Beatrice Roberts, Margaret's mother
 Victoria Bewick as Muriel Roberts, Margaret's sister
 Olivia Colman as Carol Thatcher
 Anthony Head as Sir Geoffrey Howe
 Nicholas Farrell as Airey Neave
 Richard E. Grant as Michael Heseltine
 Susan Brown as June, Margaret's live-in carer
 Martin Wimbush as Mark Carlisle
 Alexander Beardsley as young Mark Carlisle 
 Paul Bentley as Douglas Hurd
 Robin Kermode as John Major
 John Sessions as Edward Heath
 Roger Allam as Gordon Reece
 David Westhead as Reg Prentice
 Michael Pennington as Michael Foot
 Angus Wright as John Nott
 Julian Wadham as Francis Pym
 Nick Dunning as Jim Prior
 Pip Torrens as Sir Ian Gilmour
 Nicholas Jones as Admiral Sir Henry Leach
 David Rintoul as Admiral Sir John Fieldhouse
 Matthew Marsh as Alexander Haig
 Phoebe Waller-Bridge as Susie, Margaret's Secretary
 Ronald Reagan (archive footage) as himself
 Reginald Green as Ronald Reagan

Production
Filming began in the UK on 31 December 2010, and the film was released in late 2011.

In preparation for her role, Streep sat through a session at the House of Commons in January 2011 to observe British MPs in action. Extensive filming took place at the neogothic Manchester Town Hall.

Streep said: "The prospect of exploring the swathe cut through history by this remarkable woman is a daunting and exciting challenge. I am trying to approach the role with as much zeal, fervour and attention to detail as the real Lady Thatcher possesses I can only hope my stamina will begin to approach her own."

NPR commentator Robert Seigel and Thatcher biographer John Campbell accused writer Abi Morgan and star Meryl Streep of having the most say in the film's production and dictating some historical inaccuracies, such as the film's photography showing no other woman serving in the House of Commons during the time Thatcher was serving, with the hopes of presenting a different image of Thatcher to the film's American audience.

Release

Historical inaccuracies
It is suggested in the film that Thatcher had said goodbye to her friend Airey Neave only a few moments before his assassination by the Irish National Liberation Army, and had to be held back from the scene by security officers.  In fact, she was not in Westminster at the time of his death and was informed of it while carrying out official duties elsewhere.

The film does not portray any other female MPs in Parliament. In fact, during Thatcher's time in Parliament, the total number of female MPs ranged between 19 and 41. Additionally, her cabinets are always depicted as all-male, but The Baroness Young, who served as Chancellor of the Duchy of Lancaster and later Lord Privy Seal, was a cabinet member between 1981 and 1983, while also serving as leader of the House of Lords.

The Labour Party leader Michael Foot is depicted as a critic of the decision to send a task force to the Falkland Islands, and Thatcher is shown admonishing him in the wake of Britain's victory over Argentina. In fact, Foot supported the decision to send a task force, something for which Thatcher expressed her appreciation.  John Campbell noted that her decisions in office became an inspiration for the Labour Party's pro-middle ground policies enacted when Tony Blair served as Prime Minister.

Campbell also noted that while Thatcher thought the House of Commons was dominated by a patronising male environment, and that the film showed the representation from her point of view, it did not encourage her to maintain the upper middle class image she used early in her political career as the film suggests and that Thatcher did in fact exploit the fact that she was raised by a grocer in a small Lincolnshire town and had a very ordinary background when she was running for leader of the Conservative Party.

Thatcher's staunch opposition to the 1990 reunification of Germany is not mentioned. The Prime Minister had felt that reunification might pave the way for the expansion of Nazi sympathy, and distrusted the West German government.

Critical reception

The Iron Lady received mixed reviews from critics, although there was strong praise for Streep's performance. On Rotten Tomatoes, the film has an approval rating of 52% and an average score of 5.70/10, based on 234 reviews. The site's consensus reads: "Meryl Streep's performance as The Iron Lady is reliably perfect, but it's mired in bland, self-important storytelling." At Metacritic, the film has a score of 54 out of 100, based on 41 critics, indicating "mixed or average reviews". Audiences surveyed by CinemaScore gave the film an average grade of "B+" on an A+ to F scale.

The film's depiction of Thatcher has been criticised by her children, Mark and Carol, who are reported to have said, before completion of the film, that "it sounds like some left-wing fantasy." Stuart Jeffries of the British newspaper The Guardian was cautiously optimistic about a non-British actor playing Thatcher. Karen Sue Smith of America wrote that "by combining the Baroness's real roles of wife, mother and leader, the film's portrait of her does what many purported 'lives of great men' fail to do – namely, show the person in context, in the quotidian."

The Daily Telegraph reported in January 2012 that "it is impossible not to be disturbed by [Streep's] depiction of Lady Thatcher's decline into dementia" as part of an article that was headlined: "The Iron Lady reflects society's insensitive attitude towards people with dementia." Roger Ebert gave the film two stars out of four, praising Streep's performance but lamenting that "she's all dressed up with nowhere to go" in a film that cannot decide what it wants to say about Thatcher: "Few people were neutral in their feelings about her, except the makers of this picture."

Despite the film's mixed reviews, Streep's performance in the title role garnered much critical acclaim. Kevin Maher of The Times said: "Streep has found the woman within the caricature." David Gritten in The Daily Telegraph commented: "Awards should be coming Streep's way; yet her brilliance rather overshadows the film itself." Xan Brooks of The Guardian said Streep's performance "is astonishing and all but flawless". Richard Corliss of Time named Streep's performance one of the Top 10 Movie Performances of 2011.

Streep's portrayal ultimately won her the Academy Award for Best Actress (her 17th nomination and third award overall), as well as several other awards, including the BAFTA Award for Best Actress in a Leading Role and the Golden Globe Award for Best Actress – Motion Picture Drama. The film also won the Academy Award for Best Makeup.

Reactions from British politicians
In an interview with the BBC, then Prime Minister David Cameron described Streep's performance as "great" and "fantastic" but opined that the filmmakers should have waited before making the movie and focused more on Thatcher's time in office rather than her personal life and struggles with dementia. Former Conservative Party chairman Norman Fowler was more critical of the film and stated "She [Thatcher] was never, in my experience, the half-hysterical, over-emotional, over-acting woman portrayed by Meryl Streep." Thatcher's Home secretary Douglas Hurd described the dementia storyline as "ghoulish" in an interview with the Evening Standard.

Thatcher stated before her death on 8 April 2013 that she did not watch films or programmes about herself.

Box office
The film grossed $30 million in the North American market, and $85 million in other markets, for a worldwide gross of $115 million.

Soundtrack

"Soldiers of the Queen"
"MT"
"Grocer's Daughter"
"Grand Hotel"
"Swing Parliament"
"Eyelash"
"Shall We Dance?"
"Denis"
"The Great in Great Britain"
"Airey Neave"
"Discord and Harmony"
"The Twins"
"Nation of Shopkeepers"
"Fiscal Responsibility"
"Crisis of Confidence"
"Community Charge"
"Casta Diva"
"The Difficult Decisions"
"Exclusion Zone"
"Statecraft"
"Steady the Buffs"
"Prelude No. 1 in C Major, BWV 846" (Johann Sebastian Bach)

The trailer for the film features Madness's ska/pop song "Our House". The teaser trailer features Clint Mansell's theme tune for the science-fiction film Moon.

Not included on the soundtrack album or listings although credited among the eight songs at the end of the film is "I'm in Love with Margaret Thatcher" by Burnley punk band Notsensibles, which was re-released as a single due to the publicity. The song appears seventy-five minutes into the film, as part of the Falklands War victory celebrations.

Awards and nominations

Home media
The Iron Lady was released on DVD in the United States and the United Kingdom on 30 April 2012. The special features in the DVD include Making The Iron Lady, Bonus Featurettes, Recreating the Young Margaret Thatcher, Battle in the House of Commons, Costume Design: Pearls and Power Suits, Denis: The Man Behind the Woman.

See also
 2011 in film
 List of biographical films
 List of British films of 2011
 List of films set in London

References

External links
 
 

2011 drama films
2011 biographical drama films
2011 films
20th Century Fox films
BAFTA winners (films)
British biographical films
British drama films
British political films
French drama films
French political films
Entertainment One films
Films about Alzheimer's disease
Films about elections
Films about Margaret Thatcher
Films featuring a Best Actress Academy Award-winning performance
Films featuring a Best Drama Actress Golden Globe-winning performance
Films scored by Thomas Newman
Films set in 1979
Films set in 2008
Films set in the 1940s
Films set in the 1990s
Films set in London
Films shot in England
Films that won the Academy Award for Best Makeup
Film4 Productions films
Goldcrest Films films
Icon Productions films
Pathé films
Scanbox Entertainment films
Films directed by Phyllida Lloyd
Cultural depictions of Ronald Reagan
Cultural depictions of John Major
Falklands War films
Films set in the 1970s
Films set in the 1980s
Films set in 1982
Films set in 1981
Films set in the 1950s
Films set in 1990
Films about labor relations
Films set in Oxford
Films set in 1984
Films set in 1985
Films shot in Greater Manchester
Films about the Irish Republican Army
2010s English-language films
2010s British films
2010s French films